Puccinia helianthi is a plant pathogen that causes rust on sunflower.

See also
 List of Puccinia species

References

External links
 USDA ARS Fungal Database

Fungal plant pathogens and diseases
Sunflower diseases
helianthi
Fungi described in 1822